Hällefors Elkhound is a Swedish dog breed.

Appearance 
The Hällefors Elkhound is a medium-sized, rectangular Spitz with either a sickle or curly tail. Thick, harsh, and dense coat should always be yellow, ranging from fawn to reddish. The colour shade is lighter in chest, belly, legs, and below the tail. The average height for males is 55 to 63 cm and for females 52 to 60 cm.

Behaviour 
The Hällefors Elkhound is an energetic, courageous, and persistent dog with a strong character.

History 
The breed was developed in Svealand, but its more detailed area of origin has been argued. It is stated that despite its name, it was not created in Hällefors, but in Fredriksberg village located in neighbouring Ludvika Municipality. It has mainly been used as a deer-hunting dog and its most remarkable ancestors are the Finnish Spitz and the Ostyak Laika. The Swedish Kennel Club, Svenska Kennelklubben, recognized the breed in 2000 and nowadays it is also recognized in several other Nordic countries, such as Finland and Norway.

Lineage
The breed falls under the mitochondrial DNA sub-clade referred to as d1 that is only found in northern Scandinavia. It is the result of a female wolf-male dog hybridization that occurred post-domestication. Subclade d1 originated 480–3,000 years ago and is found in all Sami-related breeds: the Finnish Lapphund, Swedish Lapphund, Lapponian Herder, Swedish Elkhound, Norwegian Elkhound, Black Norwegian Elkhound and Hällefors Elkhound. The maternal wolf sequence that contributed to these breeds has not been matched across Eurasia and its branch on the phylogenetic tree is rooted in the same sequence as the 33,000 year-old Altai dog (not a direct ancestor).

See also
 Dogs portal
 List of dog breeds

References 

Rare dog breeds
Dog breeds originating in Sweden